= Issues in Environmental Science and Technology =

Book series published by the Royal Society of Chemistry

Issues in Environmental Science and Technology is a book series by the Royal Society of Chemistry, published twice a year. Each issue's content focuses on a specific theme topic. The series is written by worldwide experts in various specialist fields, and covers broader aspects of the science (such as economics and politics) as well as the narrower chemistry of environmental science. It aims to assess possible practical solutions to perceived environmental problems. The Editors Commission will review articles from authors that may come from industry, public service and academia.

The current Editors are RE Hester, University of York, England and RM Harrison, University of Birmingham, England.
